Yi Su-jin is the National Institute of the Korean Language's recommended spelling of a Korean name (이수진) consisting of the family name Yi (also spelled Lee, Rhee, I, or Ri) and the unisex given name Su-jin (also spelled Soo-jin, Sue-jin, or Su-chin). People with this name include:
 Lee Su-jin (politician) (born 1969), South Korean ex-judge and politician
Lee Soo-jin (born 1969), South Korean labor activist and politician
 Lee Su-jin (director) (born 1971), South Korean male film director
 Seomoon Tak (born Lee Su-jin, 1978), South Korean female singer and model 
 Lee Soojin, South Korean male drummer, member of Messgram

See also 
 Lee Seo-jin (born 1971), South Korean male actor